The year 1991 in archaeology involved some significant events.

Excavations
 Dmanisi historic site, Georgia.
 November–December - Scar boat burial, Orkney.
 November 4 - An archaeological expedition is launched in France, eventually resulting in the discovery of a mass grave and identification of the body of the novelist Alain-Fournier, 77 years after his death as Lieutenant Henri-Alban Fournier in World War I.

Finds
 July - Rock art at Cosquer cave in Cap Morgiou, France.
 September 19 - Ötzi the Iceman.
 September 25 - First fragment of Dmanisi hominins in Georgia.
 September - Fourteen Ancient Egyptian Boats (First Dynasty) identified at Abydos.
 Cuetlajuchitlán discovered in Mexico.
 Remains of monks at Mor Gabriel Monastery in Turkey killed by Timur's troops in 1401 are found in caves underneath the monastery.
 Cores and samples from a roof in Pueblo Bonito are dated to ca. A.D. 1082.

Publications
 Joan M. Gero and Margaret W. Conkey (ed.) - Engendering Archaeology: Women and Prehistory. Oxford: Blackwell. 
 Richard Hodges - Wall-to-Wall History: the Story of Roystone Grange. London: Duckworth 
 Charles D. Trombold and David W. Wagner - "Analysis of Prehistoric Roadways in Chaco Canyon Using Remotely Sensed Digital Data." Ancient Road Networks and Settlement Hierarchies in the New World. Cambridge University Press. .
 Colin Renfrew and Paul Bahn - Archaeology: Theories, Methods and Practice. London: Thames and Hudson. .

Awards
 Archaeologist Colin Renfrew is created a life peer as Baron Renfrew of Kaimsthorn, of Hurlet in the District of Renfrew.

Events
 Gulf War: The Basra Museum is extensively looted.

Deaths
 January 18 - Clarence Hungerford Webb, American archaeologist (b. 1902)
 March 31 - A. W. Lawrence, English Classical archaeologist (b. 1900)

References

Archaeology
Archaeology by year